Mamady Youla (born 1961) is a Guinean businessman and politician who was the Prime Minister of Guinea from 2015 to 2018.

Youla was managing director of Guinea Alumina Corporation, a mining company and subsidiary of a company based in the United Arab Emirates, from 2004 to 2015. After President Alpha Condé won a second term in the October 2015 presidential election, he appointed Youla as Prime Minister on 26 December 2015.  He took office on 29 December 2015. The government touted Youla's business experience, saying that Youla's appointment reflected Condé's focus on promoting employment and boosting the private sector.

References

1961 births
Living people
People from Conakry
Prime Ministers of Guinea
Independent politicians in Guinea
Université Félix Houphouët-Boigny alumni
21st-century Guinean politicians